Unified European Left Group (UEL) is a group in the Parliamentary Assembly of the Council of Europe, formed by 34 MPs from various leftwing parties in 16 countries. Georgios Katrougalos (Greece) is the president of the group, Andrej Hunko (Germany), Ioanetta Kavvadia (Greece) and Pablo Bustinduy (Spain) are vice-presidents of the group.

The UEL operates in the framework set out by PACE: to promote and protect human rights, rule of law and democracy. The Group is in particular inspired by the European Convention on Human Rights and the European Social Charter and by other conventions, arrangements and activities which promote and protect human dignity, social and gender equality, organized solidarity and sustainable development of the planet.

Members

As of May 2021.

Reports of former members

See also
European United Left–Nordic Green Left
European Anticapitalist Left
Party of the European Left

External links
Page on the PACE website

References

Political groups in the Parliamentary Assembly of the Council of Europe
Left-wing politics